Overton is a former civil parish, now in the parish of Malpas, in the Cheshire West and Chester district and ceremonial county of Cheshire in England. In 2001 it had a population of 68. The civil parish was abolished in 2015 and merged into Malpas. It is the site of a deserted village, a scheduled monument, the sole remains of which are earthworks.

See also

Listed buildings in Overton, Malpas
Overton Hall

References

External links

Former populated places in Cheshire
Former civil parishes in Cheshire
Malpas, Cheshire